John Benjamin Broussard (born December 18, 1983) is a former American football wide receiver. He was drafted by the Jacksonville Jaguars in the seventh round of the 2007 NFL Draft. He played college football at San Jose State.

Broussard was a member of the New York Giants Chicago Bears and Detroit Lions. He is the younger brother of San Jose SaberCats wide receiver Jamall Broussard.

Early life
Born in Port Arthur, Texas, Broussard graduated from Kingwood High School in Kingwood, Houston, Texas in 2002.

College career
As a senior at San Jose State, Broussard helped the Spartans to a victory in the inaugural New Mexico Bowl as well as helping SJSU to its first winning season in 6 years.

Professional career

Jacksonville Jaguars
On September 9, 2007, in the Jaguars first regular season game, Broussard caught the first pass of his career, a 47-yard touchdown pass from quarterback David Garrard. Broussard was waived by the Jaguars on August 26, 2008.

New York Giants
Broussard was signed to the practice squad of the New York Giants on September 24, 2008 after wide receiver Taye Biddle was promoted to the active roster. Broussard was released on October 8 to make room for Biddle on the practice squad.

Chicago Bears
Broussard was signed to the practice squad of the Chicago Bears on October 15, 2008. After finishing the season on the practice squad, he was re-signed to a future contract on December 29, 2008.

The Bears waived Broussard on August 31, 2009.

Personal life
Broussard's brother Jamall, who also went to San Jose State, played for the Cincinnati Bengals and Carolina Panthers as a return specialist in 2004.

External links

San Jose Spartans bio

1983 births
Living people
African-American players of American football
Players of American football from Houston
American football wide receivers
San Jose State Spartans football players
Jacksonville Jaguars players
New York Giants players
Chicago Bears players
Detroit Lions players
Sportspeople from Port Arthur, Texas
People from Kingwood, Texas
21st-century African-American sportspeople
20th-century African-American people